Hesperides are nymphs who tend a blissful garden in a far western corner of the world in Greek mythology.

Hesperides may also refer to:

 Hesperides, Libya
 Hesperides (poetry), a collection of poetry written by Robert Herrick
 BIO Hesperides, a Spanish polar research vessel

See also

 Hesperides Hill